Amor, Familia y Respeto (English: Love, Family and Respect) is the debut studio album by Mexican-American cumbia group A.B. Quintanilla y Los Kumbia Kings and the debut studio album by Mexican-American musician A.B. Quintanilla. It was released on March 23, 1999, by EMI Latin.

Track listing 

Notes
 "Oh No" was going to be the fifth recorded song by A.B. Quintanilla's sister Selena in 1995 in English under the title "Oh No (I'll Never Fall in Love Again)" for her album Dreaming of You but she sadly was killed the same day she was set to record it. In this album A.B. Quintanilla and Kumbia Kings recorded the song in Spanish. In 2015, Selena's father, Abraham Quintanilla Jr., released the song as thank you to the fans who kept writing letters asking about the English version. Though it was not recorded professionally, Selena performed the song at a rehearsal. 
 "U Don't Love Me" was featured on McDonald's promotional album The Rhythm in 2000.

Personnel

Kumbia Kings
 A.B. Quintanilla III – bass guitar, backing vocals, composer, producer
 Jason "DJ Kane" Cano – vocals
 Francisco "Cisko" Bautista Jr. – vocals
 Andrew "Drew" Maes – vocals
 Cruz Martínez – keyboards, composer
 Alex Ramírez – keyboards
 Roy "Slim" Ramírez – percussion, backing vocals
 Jorge Peña – percussion
 Robert "Robbie" Del Moral – drums

Additional musicians and personnel
 Pete Astudillo – composer
 Babee Power – vocals (track 7)
 Vico C – vocals (track 4)
 Sheila E. – percussion (track 4)
 Jessie García – guitar
 Luigi Giraldo – composer, engineer, mixing
 Stephanie Gómez – vocals
 Intocable – vocals (track 10)
 Ricky Muñoz – vocals, accordion
 Danny Sánchez – bajo sexto, backing vocals
 Nu Flavor – vocals (track 7)
 Frank "Pangie" Pangelinan Jr. – vocals
 Jacob Ceniceros – vocals
 Anthony DaCosta – vocals
 Rico Luna – vocals
 Steve Ochoa – vocals
 Fito Olivares – saxophone (track 5)
 Chris Pérez – guitar
 Selena Quintanilla – composer
 Cristina Saralegui – spoken intro (track 1)
 Roger Troutman – vocals (track 7)
 Ricky Vela – composer

Sales and certifications

References

1999 debut albums
Kumbia Kings albums
A. B. Quintanilla albums
Albums produced by A.B. Quintanilla
Albums produced by Cruz Martínez
EMI Latin albums
Spanish-language albums
Cumbia albums
Tejano Music Award winners for Album of the Year
Albums recorded at Q-Productions